The name USS Fort Snelling has been assigned to two dock landing ships of the United States Navy, in honor of Fort Snelling, a fort at the confluence of the Minnesota and Mississippi Rivers, for many years the northernmost military post in the land of the Sioux and Chippewa.

The unchristened hull was completed in 1956 as the roll-on/roll-off ship SS Carib Queen. In 1958 the Maritime Administration took over the vessel. She was assigned to MSTS in 1959, and renamed . Never commissioned, Taurus went out of service in 1968. Her name was struck from the Naval Vessel Register in 1971.
Her name was struck in 1992.

United States Navy ship names